Lety is a municipality and village in Písek District in the South Bohemian Region of the Czech Republic. It has about 300 inhabitants.

Administrative parts
The village of Šerkov and the hamlet of Pukňov are administrative parts of Lety.

Geography
It lies in the Benešov Uplands.

History
The first written mention of Lety is from 1312.

During the World War II, the Lety concentration camp was established in the municipality. Romani people were the largest group interned in the camp.

References

External links

Villages in Písek District